Revolutionary Sisters is a 2021 South Korean television series starring Yoon Joo-Sang, Hong Eun-Hee, Jeon Hye-bin, Kim Kyung-nam, Go Won-hee, and Lee Bo-hee. Directed by Lee Jin-seo, the weekend drama revolves around Lee sisters, who are suspected of murder of their mother during divorce proceedings of their parents. It premiered on KBS2 on March 13, 2021, and aired on every Saturday and Sunday from 19:55 (KST) till September 18.

The series ended on September 18 after 50 episodes. The 49th episode of the series aired on September 12, 2021, logged a national average viewership of 32.6% with 5.8 million viewers watching the episode, it placed the series at 7th rank among 'Top 50 series per nationwide viewers in Korea'.

Synopsis 
The series opens with the murder of a mother that is committed during  parent's divorce proceedings and all members of the Lee family and the extended family are suspected of murder. This series further tells the suspenseful but humorous story of the aftermath of the murder.

Lee Cheol-soo (Yoon Joo-sang) has three daughters, Lee Gwang-nam, Lee Gwang-sik and Lee Gwang-tae. He is a stickler for rules and principles. The  daughters resent him. Lee Gwang-nam, the eldest, is proud, selfish and the apple of her mother's eyes. Her mother has suffered due to her father, so she dislikes him. Lee Gwang-sik, the second daughter is a public officer. She is smart, principled and considerate to others. Lee Gwang-tae, the youngest daughter, is good at martial arts and works part-time. She does not consider marriage an option.

Meanwhile, since Han Ye-seul was 12, he had dreamt of becoming a trot singer.After dropping out of high school, he came to Seoul to pursue his dream.He is hard-working,kind and righteous.

Cast

Main
 Yoon Joo-sang as Lee Cheol-soo  
65 years old, father of three daughters, Bong-ja's brother-in-law, Taeng-ja's brother-in-law, works to open the toilet sewage system
 Hong Eun-hee as Lee Gwang-nam  
43 years old, first daughter, egoistic, vain and conceited, Lee Cheol-soo's first daughter, Gwang-sik and Gwang-tae's eldest sister 
 Jeon Hye-bin as Lee Gwang-sik 
 34 years old, second daughter, smart and just, wise and considerate and an intelligent government employee
 Go Won-hee as Lee Gwang-tae  
29 years old, youngest sister to Gwang-nam and Gwang-sik, 11th-degree black belts, cheerful and cool, a trend taker 
 Kim Kyung-nam as Han Ye-seul  
32 years old, a guitarist and an aspiring trot singer, Lee Gwang-sik's lover, man with good morals and values, humorous, emotional and decent character
 Choi Dae-chul as Bae Byeon-ho
45 years old, Lee Gwang-nam's husband, a successful lawyer
 Lee Bo-hee as Oh Bong-ja  
57 years old, aunt of three sisters, Cheol-soo's sister in law, Taeng-ja's older sister, owner of a one-room building
 Lee Byung-joon as Han Dol-se 
 72 years old, Han Ye-seul's father, junior from Lee park-soo's hometown

Supporting
 Kim Hyeseon as Oh Taeng-ja 
55 years old, aunt of three sisters, Cheol-soo's sister-in-law, Bong-ja's sister 
 Hong Je-yi as Oh Ttoo-gi, 
 7 years old, Taeng-ja's daughter
 Ha Jae-sook as Shin Maria
 46 years old, owner of Bae Byeon-ho's regular restaurant
 Seol Jung-hwan as Heo Gi-jin 
29 years old, Heo Poong-jin's brother
 Joo Suk-tae as Heo Poong-jin 
 38 years old, he has affection for his younger brother, Gi-jin, more than his parents
 Lee Sang-sook as deputy's mother, 65 years old
 Ho-seok as Yang Dae-chang,Han Ye-seul's friend and manager.
 Son Woo-hyeon as Na Pyeon-seung
29 years old, Gwang-sik's current husband, an elementary school classmate with Gwang-tae.
 Go Geon-han as Byun Sa-chae, 29 years old, Ki-jin's best friend
 Han Ji-wan as Min Deul-re
 Kim Na-yoon as Pyeon-seung's mother
 Song Young-jae as Pyeon-seung's father
 Seo Yoon-ah as Na Pyeon-seung's older sister
 Chun Yi-seul as Lee Tae-ri
 Park Sun-woo as Teacher Tak
 Ji Sung-won as Sang Gan-nam's wife
 Lee Ji-wan as Song Ah-reum
 Kim Ga-ran as Gwang-sik's colleague
 Park In-hwan
 Kim Jung-heon as Jin Jeong-han a guest at Lee Gwang-sik's restaurant
 Seo Do-jin as Hwang Chun-gil

Special appearance 
 Baek Seung-hee as Bae Seul-cheo, wife of Han Ye-seul's older brother, Bae-seul
 Sam Hammington as himself
 William Hammington
 Bentley Hammington
 Kim Yi-seo as Togi's kindergarten teacher

Production

Casting
With this series Yoon Joo-sang is celebrating his 50th year of debut.

Filming
Stills from filming of Go Won-hee as the youngest sister were released in February 2021. On March 6, 2021, the production crew releasing pictures of cast from filming location commented, "In fact, the actors of the 'Revolutionary Sisters' are always caring for and caring for each other, making their filming more enjoyable and joyful than ever before." On April 13 filming was temporarily stopped due to self-quarantine of cast member who came into close contact with a confirmed COVID-19 case. The subsequent airing of two episodes on April 17 and 18 were also postponed for April 24 and 25. The filming of the series ended in late August 2021.

Original soundtrack

Part 1

Part 2

Part 3

Part 4

Part 5

Part 6

Part 7

Part 8

Part 9

Viewership
Audience response
As per Nielsen Korea, the 49th episode aired on September 12, 2021, logged a national average viewership of 32.6% with 5.8 million viewers watching the episode, thereby breaking its own highest ratings. It also takes the series at 7th place among 'Top 50 series per nationwide viewers in Korea'.

Home media

The series was made available for streaming globally on Netflix from August 19, 2022.

Awards and nominations

Notes

References

External links
  
 
 
 
 Revolutionary Sisters at Daum 
 Revolutionary Sisters at Naver 

Korean Broadcasting System television dramas
2021 South Korean television series debuts
Korean-language television shows
South Korean romantic comedy television series
South Korean mystery television series
South Korean comedy-drama television series
Television series about families
South Korean thriller television series
Television series by Chorokbaem Media
Television series by Pan Entertainment
Television productions suspended due to the COVID-19 pandemic
2021 South Korean television series endings